Andrew Wilde is an English actor, known for his role as Tillotson in the 1984 film Nineteen Eighty-Four. He also appeared in the Pete Townshend short film, White City: The Music Movie.

In 2011, he stars in the first and second season of Game of Thrones.

Filmography

References

External links 

Year of birth missing (living people)
Living people
Place of birth missing (living people)
English male film actors
English male television actors